Cappelle-en-Pévèle is a commune in the Nord department in northern France.

Geography

Climate

Cappelle-en-Pévèle has a oceanic climate (Köppen climate classification Cfb).

Heraldry

See also
Communes of the Nord department

References

Cappelleenpevele
French Flanders